On the event of her wedding to Prince Henry of Battenberg at Saint Mildred's Church at Whippingham, near Osborne, on 23 July 1885, Princess Beatrice of the United Kingdom wore a wedding dress of white satin, trimmed with orange blossom and lace, the lace overskirt held by bouquets of the blossom entwined with white heather. There was lace on the pointed neck line, and on the sleeves, for the Princess was a lover of, and an expert on, lace. One of her most treasured possessions was a tunic of old point d'Alençon which had belonged to Catherine of Aragon. Knowing her daughter's love of lace, the Queen allowed Princess Beatrice to wear the Honiton lace and veil which she herself had worn on her wedding day. It was a very precious possession to the Queen, and Princess Beatrice was the only one of her daughters to be given the opportunity to wear it. Her veil was emblazoned with a diamond circlet with diamond stars, a wedding gift from her mother.

She was accompanied by ten royal bridesmaids dressed in ivory gowns.

St. Mildred's in Whippingham, where the couple was married, has a replica of the wedding dress worn by Princess Beatrice which, along with photographs from the wedding, can be viewed by visitors.

See also
 List of individual dresses

References

External links
 St. Mildred's Church Exhibit on the wedding of Princess Beatrice

1880s fashion
Beatrice
House of Saxe-Coburg and Gotha (United Kingdom)
British royal attire